The camel's nose is a metaphor for a situation where the permitting of a small, seemingly innocuous act will open the door for larger, clearly undesirable actions.

History 
The phrase is not commonly used in the 21st century. According to Geoffrey Nunberg, the image entered the English language in the middle of the 19th century. An early example is a fable printed in 1858 in which an Arab miller allows a camel to stick its nose into his bedroom, then other parts of its body, until the camel is entirely inside and refuses to leave. Lydia Sigourney wrote another version, a widely reprinted poem for children, in which the camel enters a shop because the workman does not forbid it at any stage.

The 1858 example above says, "The Arabs repeat a fable", and Sigourney says in a footnote, "To illustrate the danger of the first approach of evil habit, the Arabs have a proverb, 'Beware of the camel's nose. Nunberg could not find an Arab source for the saying, however, and suspected it was a Victorian invention.

An early citation with a tent is "The camel in the Arabian tale begged and received permission to insert his nose into the desert tent." By 1878, the expression was familiar enough that part of the story could be left unstated. "It is the humble petition of the camel, who only asks that he may put his nose into the traveler's tent. It is so pitiful, so modest, that we must needs relent and grant it."

A 1909 essay by John B. West, founder of the West legal classification system, used the metaphor to describe the difficulty of trying to insert an otherwise innocuous set of facts into a rigid legal system:
three excellent digesters [] spent an entire day in disagreeing as to whether seal fishery cases should be classified under the topic 'Fish' or that of 'Game' .... It is the old story of the camel's head in the tent. What seems at first a plausible pretext for forcing some novel case or new principle into a topic or subdivision to which it does not naturally belong, leads to hopeless confusion.

In a 1915 book of fables by Horace Scudder, the story titled The Arab and His Camel ends with the moral: "It is a wise rule to resist the beginnings of evil."

U.S. Senator Barry Goldwater used the metaphor in expressing his opposition to the National Defense Education Act in 1958:
This bill and the foregoing remarks of the majority remind me of an old Arabian proverb: "If the camel once gets his nose in the tent, his body will soon follow." If adopted, the legislation will mark the inception of aid, supervision, and ultimately control of education in this country by the federal authorities.

The phrase was used in Reed v. King, 145 Cal.App.3d 261, 266, 193 Cal.Rptr. 130 (1983) "The paramount argument against an affirmative conclusion is it permits the camel's nose of unrestrained irrationality admission to the tent. If such an 'irrational' consideration is permitted as a basis of rescission the stability of all conveyances will be seriously undermined." The case in question involved a plaintiff suing because the defendant sold a house without telling them that the house's previous inhabitants had been brutally murdered 10 years earlier.

In 2019, a version of the phrase was used by Wisconsin Supreme Court Justice Ann Walsh Bradley in a concurring opinion addressing a coverage dispute among feuding liability insurers (Steadfast Ins. Co. v. Greenwich Ins. Co., 2019 WI 6), noting that allowing a non-breaching insurer to recover its attorney's fees from a breaching insurer would abrogate the American Rule (each party is responsible for its own fees regardless of result) to such an extent that "once the camel's nose is in the tent, the rest will likely follow."

Related expressions 

There are a number of other metaphors and expressions which refer to small changes leading to chains of events with undesirable or unexpected consequences, differing in nuances. 

English language
"Give them an inch; they'll take a mile." The original saying goes "Give them an inch, and they'll take an ell."
"The thin end of the wedge"
 This concept was the premise of the children's book If You Give a Mouse a Cookie.
 "If you let the pig under the bed today, tomorrow it will demand to be on the bed" is a popular saying in Bulgarian culture that stems from a story about a pig begging its owner to be allowed to sleep under his bed for warmth, the owner's acquiescence having created in the pig the boldness the next day to now request permission to sleep on (rather than under) the bed the following night.
Other languages
In Malay culture, the saying goes "diberi betis, hendakkan paha" (offering a calf, then wanting a thigh).
In Chinese culture, the "inch-mile" saying corresponds to the chengyu (four-character expression) , which is a quotation from the Book of Later Han about a Chinese general who took over Long (now Gansu) only to pursue further southwards into Shu (now Sichuan).
 In Romanian culture, there is the expression  Give a finger, he takes your hand.
 In Russian culture a similar phrase sounds, literally translated, as "offer him a finger, and he will bite a hand off up to the elbow".
 In Polish, the "Give him a finger and he'll take the whole arm!" is increasingly replaced with an abbreviated form, and the reminder implicit: "Give him a finger...!"
 Another Polish proverb: Daj kurze grzędę, a ona "Wyżej siędę!" (Give the hen a perch, and she'll say "I'll roost somewhere (even) higher!").
 In Finnish, there is the expression  ("If you offer the devil [even just] a little finger, it takes the whole hand/arm").
 In German, there is the expression  ("If you give somebody the little finger, he will take your whole hand").
 In Dutch, there is the expression  ("If you give him a finger, he will take your whole hand").
 In Greek, a similar expression is:  ("Give the peasant freedom, and he will hop on your bed").
 In Georgian, there is the expression:  ("You let the hog louse on your foot, and it will crawl on the top of your head").
 In Norwegian there is an expression:  (A rolling snowball will be harder to stop).
In Hindi, there is the expression:  उँगली पकड़ कर पहुँचा पकड़ना ("Give a finger, pull the wrist")

Vietnamese Expression - "Give them a dog, they want an elephant."

See also 
Creeping normality
Foot in the door – a persuasion technique
Slippery slope – an argument, sometimes fallacious
Domino effect
For Want of a Nail – the claim that large consequences may follow from inattention to small details
Boiling frog – the notion that gradual change tends to go unnoticed until it is too late, often discussed by drawing an analogy to a false story about what will allegedly happen to a frog in gradually warmed water

References

Causality
Metaphors referring to animals